ARM Huracán (A-301) is a missile boat in the Mexican Navy. Previously the Israeli Navy  INS Aliya when it was bought by Mexico for the Mexican Navy. Press reports indicate that the Israelis removed the Harpoon missile systems prior to the sale, though the Gabriel anti-ship missile systems were included in the package.

ARM Huracán was built by Israel Shipyards Ltd in 1981 and underwent a complete overhaul before its transfer to the Mexican Navy on August 23, 2004.

References

Ships built in Israel
1984 ships
Sa'ar 4.5-class missile boats of the Mexican Navy
Missile boats of Mexico